Phosphatidate cytidylyltransferase 2 is an enzyme that in humans is encoded by the CDS2 gene.

Breakdown products of phosphoinositides are ubiquitous second messengers that function downstream of many G protein-coupled receptors and tyrosine kinases regulating cell growth, calcium metabolism, and protein kinase C activity. This gene encodes an enzyme which regulates the amount of phosphatidylinositol available for signaling by catalyzing the conversion of phosphatidic acid to CDP-diacylglycerol. This enzyme is an integral membrane protein localized to two subcellular domains, the matrix side of the inner mitochondrial membrane where it is thought to be involved in the synthesis of phosphatidylglycerol and cardiolipin. and the cytoplasmic side of the endoplasmic reticulum where it functions in phosphatidylinositol biosynthesis. Two genes encoding this enzyme have been identified in humans, one mapping to human chromosome 4q21 (CDS1) and a second (this gene) to 20p13.

Model organisms

Model organisms have been used in the study of CDS2 function. A conditional knockout mouse line, called Cds2tm1a(KOMP)Wtsi was generated as part of the International Knockout Mouse Consortium program, a high-throughput mutagenesis project to generate and distribute animal models of disease to interested scientists.

Male and female animals underwent a standardized phenotypic screen to determine the effects of deletion. Twenty six tests were carried out and two phenotypes were reported. No homozygous mutant embryos were identified during gestation, and therefore none survived until weaning. The remaining tests were carried out on heterozygous mutant adult mice; no significant abnormalities were observed in these animals.

References

External links

Further reading 

 
 
 

EC 2.7.7
Genes mutated in mice